Tropico del nord is an album released by the Italian rock band Pooh in 1983. According to the liner notes, it was the first album ever released on CD by an Italian band. It signals a change of direction for the band, with their earlier hard rock style replaced by a pop-oriented sound. Although the promotional tour proved that Pooh were still a strong draw, the album didn't fare as well on the charts as their previous releases.

Track listing

Personnel

Pooh
 Roby Facchinetti – vocals, piano, Fairlight CMI
 Dodi Battaglia – guitars, vocals
 Red Canzian – bass guitar, vocals
 Stefano D'Orazio – drums, percussion, vocals 

Production
 Luciano Tallarini – art direction
 Maurizio Biancani – engineering, mixing
 Marco Inzadi – mastering
 Jeremy Allom, Steve Culnane, Osiride Gozzi – studio assistants

Design
 Alessandro Gerini – graphics
 Roberto Tomasin – photography

External links 

1983 albums